Green Apple Books & Music is an independent bookstore in the Richmond District of San Francisco, California.

History
Green Apple Books was founded by Richard Savoy in 1967 in a pre-1906 building at the corner of Clement Street and Sixth Avenue. In 1996 Green Apple Books acquired its long-time neighbor, Revolver Records. The store houses over 250,000 titles, as well as 60,000 available online.

After 30 years, Richard Savoy set up a ten-year buy-out for Green Apple Books & Music with three long-time employees.

Recognition
Green Apple Books was voted "Best Independent Bookstore" in the Bay Area by San Francisco Chronicle readers in 2001.

Green Apple Books was voted "Best Used Books Store" by the SF Weekly editorial staff in 2005 and the readers of the San Francisco Bay Guardian in 2006.

Green Apple Books was named Publishers Weekly's best bookstore of 2014.

References

External links
Green Apple Books & Music official website
American Booksellers Association Article

Bookstores in the San Francisco Bay Area
Independent bookstores of the United States
Buildings and structures in San Francisco
Richmond District, San Francisco
Retail buildings in California
Companies based in San Francisco
Bookstores established in the 20th century
American companies established in 1967
Retail companies established in 1967
1967 establishments in California